Thalassodes chloropsis is a moth of the family Geometridae first described by Edward Meyrick in 1886. It is found in Fiji.

The wingspan is 23–34 mm. The face is green. The head, thorax and abdomen are light bluish green. The antennae, top of the head and underside of the body are white. The abdomen and thorax have a white dorsal line posteriorly. The wings are light bluish green patterned with white.

References

Moths described in 1886
Hemitheini